Ali Mohamed Muheeb (26 March 1935 – 26 September 2010) was an Egyptian diver. He competed in the men's 3 metre springboard event at the 1960 Summer Olympics.

References

External links
 

1935 births
2010 deaths
Egyptian male divers
Olympic divers of Egypt
Divers at the 1960 Summer Olympics
Place of birth missing
20th-century Egyptian people
21st-century Egyptian people